Wienecke is a surname. Notable people with the surname include:

Barbara Wienecke, Namibian-born Australian scientist
Henriette Wienecke (1819–1907), Norwegian-Danish composer
Johannes Cornelis Wienecke (1872-1945), Dutch medallist